Bardhyl Kollçaku is a former Albanian military officer, who served as the Chief of General Staff of the Albanian Armed Forces.

Chief of General Staff

In 2017, Kollçaku was made the new Chief of General Staff of Albanian Armed Forces by Presidential Decree, issued by President Ilir Meta. He was succeeded in this role by Major General Bajram Begaj in 2020.

Personal life

Kollçaku is married to Valbona Kollçaku and has two children, Argios and Kejsi.

References

1967 births
Living people
People from Berat
Albanian generals
Members of the Parliament of Albania